Thaxler is an unincorporated community in Smith County, Mississippi, United States.

Notes

Unincorporated communities in Smith County, Mississippi
Unincorporated communities in Mississippi